The Taipei Metro Wende station is located in the Neihu District in Taipei, Taiwan. It is a station on Brown Line.

Station overview

This two-level, elevated station features two side platforms, two exits, and a platform elevator located on the north side of the concourse level.

Public art for the station consists of a piece titled "Dancing Birds". It comprises one of the station walls and depicts dancing egrets in Bihu Park with the use of digital images and mosaic inlaying.

Two mechanical parking towers behind the station allow for over 300 parking spaces. The towers are a type of elevator parking system; vehicles can be parked and retrieved on the same rotating lift table.

History
22 February 2009: Wende station construction is completed.
4 July 2009: Begins operations with the opening of the Brown Line.

Station layout

Around the station
 Neihu High School
 Neihu Junior High School
 Neihu Elementary School
 National Taiwan College of Performing Arts
 Guo Ziyi Memorial Hall
 Liuzhongyuan Community
 Bihu Park
 Yangguan Park
 Wende Park No. 2
 Ronald McDonald House Taiwan
 Fire Safety Museum of Taipei City Fire Department

References

Wenhu line stations
Railway stations opened in 2009